Air Vice-Marshal Ian W. Duguid,  (born 1 December 1966) is a senior Royal Air Force serving as air office commanding No. 1 Group RAF, headquartered at RAF High Wycombe in Buckinghamshire. Duguid was a Harrier pilot and Typhoon Force Commander before assuming the role of the Air Officer Commanding of No. 11 Group, which he served as from 2018 to November 2021.

RAF career
Duguid was educated at Scarborough Sixth Form College and King's College London (MSc Defence Studies).

Duguid was commissioned into the Royal Air Force in 1986. While a squadron commander of one of the Harrier squadrons in the 1990s, Duguid was known by the nickname of "Squid". After operational service protecting the Iraqi no-fly zones, he commanded No. 4 Squadron RAF in Afghanistan in 2006 to 2007, for which he was mentioned in despatches. He then became Deputy Assistant Chief of Staff Capability at RAF Air Command in September 2008, Head of Defence Operational Capability at the Ministry of Defence in December 2012 and commander of the Typhoon Force in March 2015. He was appointed Chief of Staff Operations, Headquarters Air Command and Air Officer Commanding No. 11 Group RAF in October 2018 which he served as until November 2021. He was appointed Air Officer Commanding No. 1 Group RAF on 12 November 2021.

Duguid was appointed Officer of the Order of the British Empire (OBE) in the 2009 New Year Honours, and Companion of the Order of the Bath (CB) in the 2021 New Year Honours.

References

|-

|-

1966 births
Alumni of King's College London
Companions of the Order of the Bath
Living people
Officers of the Order of the British Empire
Royal Air Force air marshals
Royal Air Force personnel of the War in Afghanistan (2001–2021)